Geoffrey Harold Posner (born 7 July 1949) is a British television producer and director. Posner has directed and produced some of Britain's most successful comedy shows since the early 1980s.

Career
Starting off as a director on the satirical show Not the Nine O'Clock News, he also directed Revolting Women for BBC Manchester in 1981, a sketch show featuring amongst others Jeni Barnett and Linda Broughton, and in 1982 went on to direct the groundbreaking BBC2 anti-sitcom The Young Ones. Working also as an assistant producer on that show, he went on to produce in the same year the unaired pilot of the Rowan Atkinson historical sitcom Blackadder. One of his biggest successes came in 1985, when he produced and directed the multi-award-winning Victoria Wood As Seen On TV, a sketch show written by (and starring) the comedian.

Posner has since produced and directed some of the most popular British television comedies of the 1990s and 2000s. They include Harry Enfield's Television Programme, French & Saunders, Paul Calf's Video Diaries, and  dinnerladies. More recently he was one of the TV directors covering the Live 8 concert. He was also producer of the second and third series of Little Britain.

His shows have won six BAFTA awards and been nominated for another seven.

Posner formed Pozzitive Television with fellow TV producer David Tyler in 1992.

Posner also directed the 1998 Eurovision Song Contest in Birmingham and the Queen's Diamond Jubilee Concert in 2012.

He was awarded an honorary doctorate from the University of Essex in 2016.

Television productions 
Revolting Women, director, episode one, 1981
Top of the Pops, director, five episodes, 1980-1981 
Not the Nine O'Clock News, director, series 4, 1982
Blackadder, director, pilot, 1982
Blankety Blank, director, one episode, 1982
The Young Ones, director, 1982
Carrott's Lib, director, 1982 - 1983
The Lenny Henry Show, director, 1984-1988
 Madness The Pilot, director, TV short, 1984
Lenny Henry Tonite, director, 1986
French and Saunders, director, 1987-1988
The Robbie Coltrane Special, director, 1989
Victoria Wood: As Seen on TV, director/producer, 1989
John Sessions' Tall Tales, director, 1991
Josie, director, 1991
Paul Merton: The Series, director, 1991
Harry Enfield's Television Programme, director, 1992
Victoria Wood's All Day Breakfast, director, 1992
It's A Mad World, World, World, World, director, 1994
Paul Calf's Video Diary, director / producer, 1994
Victoria Wood: Live In Your Own Home, director/ producer, 1994
A Christmas Night With the Stars, director, 1994
Pauline Calf's Wedding Video, director/ producer, 1994
Coogan's Run, director/ producer, 1995
The Tony Ferrino Phenomenon, director/ producer, 1997
Harry Enfield and Chums, director/ producer, 1997
Victoria Wood: Live, director/ producer, 1997
Eurovision Song Contest 1998, director, 1998
Stephen Fry's Live From The Lighthouse, director/ producer, 1998
Steve Coogan: The Man Who Thinks He's It, director/ producer, 1998
dinnerladies, director/ producer, 1998-2000
tlc, director/ producer, 2002
The Prince's Trust 30th Birthday: Live, director/ producer, 2006
Little Britain series 2 and 3, director/ producer, 2004-2006
Music Hall Meltdown, director/ producer, 2007
Giles Wemmbley-Hogg Goes Off... to Glastonbury, director/producer, 2007
Marcus Brigstocke: Planet Corduroy, director/producer, 2007
Saturday Live Again, director/ producer, 2007
Two Pints of Lager and a Packet of Crisps, 'The Aftermath', director, 2009
Big Top, director/ producer, 2009
The Angina Monologues, director/ producer, 2010
The One Ronnie, director/ producer, 2010
Come Fly With Me, producer, 2010-2011
The One Griff Rhys Jones, director/ producer, 2012
Catherine Tate's Nan, director/ producer, 2014-2015
Victoria Wood: From Soup to Nuts, executive producer, 2018

Other work 
Posner also produced and directed a number of live events, including the Opening Ceremony of the London 2012 Olympic Games, the Royal Wedding of Prince William and Kate Middleton, and the Jubilee Gala 2013.

Notable awards and nominations 

Carrott's Lib, BAFTA, Best Light Entertainment Programme - winner, 1984
Victoria Wood: As Seen on TV, BAFTA, Best Light Entertainment Programme - winner, 1986
Victoria Wood: As Seen on TV, BAFTA, Best Light Entertainment Programme - winner, 1987 a
Victoria Wood on TV, BAFTA, Best Light Entertainment Programme - winner, 1988
French and Saunders, BAFTA, Best Light Entertainment Programme - nominated, 1989
The Lenny Henry Show, BAFTA, Best Light Entertainment Programme - nominated, 1989
Harry Enfield's Television Programme, BAFTA, Best Light Entertainment Programme - nominated, 1993
Pauline Calf's Wedding Video (as Three Fights, Two Weddings, and a Funeral), BAFTA, Best Television Comedy - winner, 1995
dinnerladies, BAFTA, Television Comedy - nominated, 1999
Eurovision Song Contest, Best Live Outside Broadcast Coverage - nominated, 1999
dinnerladies, BAFTA, Situation Comedy - nominated, 2000

References

External links
 Geoff Posner at the BBC Programme Catalogue

1949 births
Living people
British television producers